Making a Real Killing: Rocky Flats and the Nuclear West is a 1999 book by Len Ackland. Ackland draws on information obtained from governmental sources, federal contractors, personal interviews, and newspaper articles to form a multi-layered history about the controversial Rocky Flats nuclear facility.  The book also explores the creation and collapse of the nuclear weapons complex in the United States.

Reviews of Making a Real Killing have been published in Environmental History and Pacific Historical Review.

Len Ackland is the former editor of the Bulletin of the Atomic Scientists and director for environmental journalism at the University of Colorado at Boulder.

See also
Dark Circle, an award-winning PBS documentary
List of books about nuclear issues
List of anti-nuclear protests in the United States
Radioactive contamination from the Rocky Flats Plant

References

1999 non-fiction books
Books about nuclear issues
Jefferson County, Colorado
Nuclear history
Rocky Flats Plant